A Mix-Up in Pedigrees is a 1913 American silent short comedy film starring William Garwood and Francelia Billington. Prints and/or fragments were found in the Dawson Film Find in 1978.

External links

1913 films
1913 comedy films
Silent American comedy films
American silent short films
American black-and-white films
1913 short films
American comedy short films
1910s American films